The 1977 Richmond Tennis Classic was a men's tennis tournament played on indoor carpet courts at the Richmond Coliseum in Richmond, Virginia, United States. The event was part 1977 World Championship Tennis circuit. It was the 12th edition of the tournament and was held from February 1 through February 6, 1977. Unseeded Tom Okker won the singles title and earned $30,000 first-prize money.

Finals

Singles
 Tom Okker defeated  Vitas Gerulaitis 3–6, 6–3, 6–4

Doubles
 Wojciech Fibak /  Tom Okker defeated  Ross Case /  Tony Roche 6–4, 6–4

References

External links
 ITF tournament edition details

Richmond Tennis Classic
Richmond Tennis Classic
Richmond Tennis Classic